Daniel Giasson (born 24 August 1987), is a Brazilian born, Italian futsal player who plays for Jaén and the Italian national futsal team.

References

External links
UEFA profile

1987 births
Living people
Brazilian emigrants to Italy
Italian men's futsal players